The Changthangi or Changpa is a breed of cashmere goat native to the high plateaus of Ladakh in northern India. It is closely associated with the nomadic Changpa people of the Changthang plateau. It may also be known as the Ladakh Pashmina or Kashmiri.

The intense cold of the region causes the goats to grow a thick undercoat, which is harvested to produce the fine pashmina grade of cashmere. In the twenty-first century the quality of the pashmina is threatened by global climate change; approximately three quarters of Indian pashmina production is from these goats. They are also used as pack animals and for meat.

Description 
These goats are generally domesticated and are reared by nomadic communities called the Changpa in the Changthang regions of Ladakh, including the Kharnak, Rupshu, Demchok/Skakjung and the Pangong Lake regions. 

These goats provide the wool for Kashmir's famous pashmina shawls. Shawls made from Pashmina wool are considered very fine, and are exported worldwide.

The Changthangi goats have revitalised the poor economy of Changthang, Ladakh where the wool production generates more than $8 million a year.

Noori, the world's first cloned Pashmina goat, was cloned at the Faculty of Veterinary Sciences and Animal Husbandry of the Sher-e-Kashmir University of Agricultural Sciences and Technology of Kashmir (SKUAST) in Shuhama, 25 km east of Srinagar, on 15 March 2012.

Characteristics 

The ears are small and upright. The coat consists of an outer coat of long hair, and a thick undercoat of fine pashmina; it is commonly white, but can also be black, brown or grey. The skin is white or pale brown.

See also
William Windsor (goat)
Turfani pashm

References

Goat breeds
Fiber-producing goat breeds
Meat goat breeds
Goat breeds originating in India
Cashmere wool

ar:ماعز البشمين
cs:Kašmírská koza
de:Kaschmirziege
eo:Kaŝmirkapro